Julius Alexander Thomson (September 4, 1882 – October 26, 1940) was a Canadian rower who competed in the 1908 Summer Olympics. He was a crew member of the Canadian boat, which won the bronze medal in the men's eight.

References

External links
Julius Thomson's profile at databaseOlympics

1882 births
1940 deaths
Canadian male rowers
Olympic rowers of Canada
Rowers at the 1908 Summer Olympics
Olympic bronze medalists for Canada
Olympic medalists in rowing
Medalists at the 1908 Summer Olympics